Nicholas Cornwell (born 1972), better known by his pen name Nick Harkaway, is a British novelist and commentator. As Harkaway, he is the author of the novels The Gone-Away World, Angelmaker (which was nominated for the 2013 Arthur C. Clarke award), Tigerman, and Gnomon; and a non-fiction study of the digital world, The Blind Giant: Being Human in a Digital World. Cornwell has also written two novels under the pseudonym Aidan Truhen.

Life
Harkaway was born Nicholas Cornwell in Cornwall. He is the son of Valérie Jane Eustace and author David Cornwell, famous under his pen name John le Carré.

Harkaway was educated at the independent University College School in North London, and Clare College, Cambridge, where he studied philosophy, sociology and politics and took up Shorinji Kan Jiu Jitsu. He worked in the film industry before becoming an author.

Fiction

The Gone-Away World
The Gone-Away World (2008) is Harkaway's first novel. Originally titled The Wages of Gonzo Lubitsch, it concerns a number of ex-special forces operatives turned truckers who are hired to perform a dangerous mission in a post-apocalyptic world.

Angelmaker
Angelmaker (2013) is a spy thriller detailing a clockmaker's attempt to stop a Cold War era doomsday weapon. Angelmaker won Best Novel in the 2013 Kitschies and was also nominated for that year's Arthur C. Clarke award.

Tigerman
Tigerman (2014) concerns a superhero origin story on an impoverished and doomed tropical island.

Gnomon 
Gnomon (2017) deals with a state that exerts ubiquitous surveillance on its population. A detective investigates a murder through unconventional methods that leads to questions about her society's very nature.

The Price You Pay (as Aidan Truhen) 
The Price You Pay (2018) concerns a drug dealer's quest for revenge on those who took out a contract on his life.

Seven Demons (as Aidan Truhen) 
Seven Demons (2021), a sequel to The Price You Pay, is a heist thriller about an attempt to rob a high-security bank in Switzerland.

Non-fiction 
The Blind Giant (2012), Harkaway's first work of non-fiction, dealt with the effect of digital change on society and what it means to be human.

Views on Google Book settlement 

Harkaway has been an outspoken critic of the Google Book Search Settlement Agreement, posting on his blog, speaking out on BBC Radio’s The World at One in May 2009, and appearing on a television debate with Krishnan Guru-Murthy and Tom Watson MP in September 2009.

References

External links

 
Review of The Gone-Away World, The Guardian

 

1972 births
21st-century English novelists
English science fiction writers
Living people
Alumni of Clare College, Cambridge
Date of birth missing (living people)
English male novelists
Novelists from Cornwall
21st-century English male writers
People educated at University College School
English male non-fiction writers
21st-century pseudonymous writers